Calahan O'Reilly (born September 30, 1986) is a Canadian professional ice hockey forward who is currently under contract to the Lehigh Valley Phantoms of the American Hockey League (AHL). O'Reilly's younger brother Ryan is a forward for the Toronto Maple Leafs.

Playing career
O'Reilly grew up in the small community of Seaforth, Ontario playing minor hockey for the Seaforth Stars and the Huron-Perth Lakers (MHAO).  After his minor midget season he was drafted in the 8th round (150th overall) by the Windsor Spitfires in the 2002 OHL Priority Selection.  O'Reilly played the 2002–03 season with the St. Marys Lincolns Jr.B. team of the Western Ontario Hockey League (OHA), where he led all rookies in scoring and made the WOHL All-Rookie Team, prior to suiting up for the Windsor Spitfires the following season.

In his rookie season (2003–2004) O'Reilly struggled offensively out of the gate, scoring just 3 goals and tallying 18 assists for a total of 21 points, and was a -1 on the season, but was a strong defensive contributor on a defensively weak team, and also greatly improved his penalty killing and stick checking ability throughout this season. In the playoffs, O'Reilly dressed in 3 of the team's 4 games, tallying 1 assist and was a -minus 2. The following season (2004–05), O'Reilly came back as a man on a mission, tallying 24 goals and 50 assists, for a total of 74 points, finishing 2nd in Team Scoring, while also establishing the best plus minus rating on the team at +9, providing more evidence to O'Reilly's strong defensive game as a Centre. During the 2005 playoffs, O'Reilly helped lead the Spitfires to the second round, tallying 4 goals and 5 assists, for 9 points, placing him tied for second in team playoff scoring.

O'Reilly would return for the 2005–06 OHL regular season as a third year Spitfire veteran to truly lead by example, setting the team scoring pace by tallying 18 goals and 81 assists (tied for 3rd in the league with Wojtek Wolski). The closest Spitfire trailed O'Reilly by 47 points (Ryan Garlock 20 goals, 32 assists, 52 points)

O'Reilly was drafted 150th overall in the fifth round of the 2005 NHL Entry Draft by the Nashville Predators. He played with the Windsor Spitfires of the Ontario Hockey League (OHL) from 2003–04 to the 2005–06 season. He made his NHL debut in 2008–09. O'Reilly scored his first NHL goal against Los Angeles Kings goalie Jonathan Quick on March 28, 2009.

On July 7, 2011, O'Reilly signed a one-year contract with the Nashville Predators. At the start of the following 2011–12 season on October 28, 2011, O'Reilly was traded from the Predators to the Phoenix Coyotes for a 4th-round draft pick in 2012.

On February 1, 2012, O'Reilly was picked up on waivers by the Pittsburgh Penguins. He made his debut with the team 3 days later against Boston Bruins.  He recorded his first point with the Penguins on February 5 against the New Jersey Devils.

On July 16, 2012, O'Reilly signed a two-year contract with Kontinental Hockey League team, Metallurg Magnitogorsk.

After a successful debut season with Metallurg, due to injury O'Reilly failed to replicate his form and was released from his second year after only 14 games. On November 19, 2013, O'Reilly signed a standard player contract (SPC) for the remainder of the 2013-14 season with the Utica Comets of the AHL. He was instrumental in turning the Comets season around, scoring 45 points in 52 games in falling short of the playoffs.

On July 2, 2014, O'Reilly signed a contract with the Comets parent NHL club, the Vancouver Canucks on a one-year deal. O'Reilly was returned on assignment to Captain the Utica Comets for the 2014–15 season.

On July 1, 2015, O'Reilly signed a two-year one-way contract with the Buffalo Sabres, worth $700,000 per year, uniting him with his newly acquired brother Ryan.

Entering the 2016–17 season, O'Reilly continued his second year within the Sabres organization as the captain of AHL affiliate, the Rochester Americans. He was recalled and featured in 11 games with the Sabres for 1 assist, however primarily remained with the cellar-dwelling Americans with 42 points in 47 games. O'Reilly was loaned by the Sabres organization to the Toronto Marlies on March 8, 2017.

On July 1, 2017, O'Reilly left the Sabres as a free agent, signing a two-year, two-way deal with the Minnesota Wild.

After playing the majority of his contract with the Wild as captain of the Iowa Wild in the AHL, O'Reilly left as a free agent to continue in the AHL by signing a two-year deal with the Lehigh Valley Phantoms, affiliate to the Philadelphia Flyers, on July 1, 2019.

On April 26, 2021, O'Reilly recorded 3 assists for the Lehigh Valley Phantoms in a win over the Binghamton Devils, giving him 500 career assists in the American Hockey League. O'Reilly is the 10th player in the league's history to record 500 assists. During During the 2021-2022 season, he reached the 1,000 games played milestone.

Personal life
O'Reilly's younger brother Ryan played with the Colorado Avalanche and St. Louis Blues till he was traded to the Toronto Maple Leafs in 2023, and their cousin Bill Bowler is currently the Windsor Spitfires General Manager in the OHL where he is one of the all-time points scorers. His sister, Tara O'Reilly, served as captain of the Carleton Ravens women's ice hockey program in 2009.

O'Reilly is married to former Canadian figure skater Terra Findlay.

Career statistics

References

External links

Article: O'Reilly conditions for rookie season with Milwaukee

1986 births
Living people
Buffalo Sabres players
Canadian expatriate ice hockey players in Russia
Canadian ice hockey centres
Iowa Wild players
Lehigh Valley Phantoms players
Metallurg Magnitogorsk players
Milwaukee Admirals players
Minnesota Wild players
Nashville Predators draft picks
Nashville Predators players
Phoenix Coyotes players
Pittsburgh Penguins players
Portland Pirates players
Rochester Americans players
Ice hockey people from Toronto
Toronto Marlies players
Utica Comets players
Wilkes-Barre/Scranton Penguins players
Windsor Spitfires players